Caolas, is a small settlement on the island of Vatersay, in the Outer Hebrides, Scotland. Caolas is within the parish of Barra. It is the westernmost settlement in Scotland. Previously, the village on Hirta claimed this title; Hirta was also the most western settlement in the United Kingdom, which is now Belleek, County Fermanagh, Northern Ireland.

 is a word (in both Scottish Gaelic and Irish) meaning "straits" and frequently rendered as "kyles" in English.

References

External links

 Canmore - Vatersay, Caolas site record
 Canmore - Vatersay, Dun A' Chaolais site record
 Canmore - Vn25 North Vatersay site record

Villages in the Outer Hebrides